Michael Franklyn Bolin (born October 1, 1948) is an American lawyer and jurist from Alabama. He served as an associate justice of the Alabama Supreme Court from 2005 to 2023.

Early life and education 

Bolin was born in Jefferson County, Alabama in 1948. He attended elementary school in Birmingham, being accepted into the first magnet school for scholastic achievement. He then attended Homewood Junior High School, and graduated from Shades Valley High School in 1966 as a member of the National Honor Society. In 1970, he received his Bachelor of Science in Business Administration from Samford University. In 1973, he received his Juris Doctor from Cumberland School of Law, graduating cum laude. At Cumberland, he was on the Dean's List and served as Associate Editor of the Cumberland-Samford Law Review. He was later inducted into Curia Honors, Cumberland's leadership and honor society.

Career 

Bolin was a practicing attorney in Birmingham from 1973 through 1988, when he was elected as Probate Judge of Jefferson County. He was re-elected to that position in 1994 and 2000. He served in that position until his election to the Alabama Supreme Court in 2004, and began serving as an associate justice beginning January 14, 2005. He was re-elected in 2010 and 2016.

He was active in the Alabama Probate Judges Association, serving as chairman of various association committees. He was elected by his peers as President, Secretary, and Treasurer of the Probate Judges Association. He served on the Children's Code Committee, Probate Procedures Committee, Adoption Committee, and Paternity Committee of the Alabama Law Institute.

He authored the Putative Father Registry law in Alabama, which protects the rights of all parties in adoption proceedings. He received the national award from the "Angels of Adoption" organization in Washington, D.C. in 2000 for his service to adoptive families. He additionally served as Chief Election Official, Chairman of the Alabama Electronic Voting Committee, and as Vice Chairman of the Governor's Commission on Consolidation, Efficiency, and Funding in 2003. He is a member of the Vestavia-Hoover Kiwanis Club and was Chairman of the Jefferson County Republican Party (2003-2004).

References

External links

http://votesmart.org/candidate/biography/58799/michael-bolin#.VBIrzywtCUk
http://judicial.alabama.gov/CourtMemberBio/ViewBio?id=29

1948 births
Living people
20th-century American judges
20th-century American lawyers
21st-century American judges
Alabama Republicans
Cumberland School of Law alumni
Justices of the Supreme Court of Alabama
People from Jefferson County, Alabama
Samford University alumni